Slovenes of Croatia are one of 22 national minorities in Croatia. According to 2011 census, there were 10,517 Slovenes in Croatia, with majority (approximately 60%) living in only three counties Istria County, Primorje-Gorski Kotar County and consolidated city-county Zagreb.

Slovenes are officially recognized as an autochthonous national minority, and as such, they elect a special representative to the Croatian Parliament, shared with members of four other national minorities.

Demographics

Historical

2011 Census

Culture
Slovene minority in Croatia has "Central library of Slovenes in Republic of Croatia" in Karlovac.

Associations
 Cultural and Educational Society "Slovenski dom", Zagreb		
 Cultural and Educational Society "Slovenski dom Bazovica", Rijeka		
 Slovene Cultural Society "Triglav", Split
 Society of Slovenes "Dr. France Prešeren", Šibenik	
 Slovene Cultural Society "Lipa", Dubrovnik		
 Slovene Cultural Society "Lipa", Zadar		
 Slovene Cultural Society "Istra", Pula		
 Slovene Cultural and Artistic Society "Snežnik", Lovran
 Society of Slovenes "Labin", Labin	
 Cultural Society "Slovenski dom Karlovac", Karlovac		
 Slovene Cultural Society "Stanko Vraz", Osijek
 Slovene Cultural Society "Oljka", Poreč

Notable people
Notable people with Slovene roots include:

 Stanko Vraz, Croatian and Slovene poet
 Antun Mahnić, (1850-1920) Croatian bishop
 Josip Križaj, (1887-1968) Slovene and Croatian opera singer
 Josip Broz Tito, (1892-1980) Yugoslav president
 Žarko Dolinar, (1920-2003) Croatian biologist and table tennis player
 Jože Pogačnik, Croatian historian of literature
 Ivan Snoj, Croatian handball player
 Iztok Puc, Slovenian handball player
 Dragan Holcer, Yugoslav football player
 Franjo Bučar, (1866-1946) writer and sport populazer 
 Mira Furlan, actress and singer 
 Vladko Maček, (1879-1964) politician 
 Martina Majerle, singer 
 Josip Srebrnič, (1876-1966) prelate
 Marijan Žužej, water polo player
 Dubravko Šimenc, water polo player
 Zlatko Šimenc, water polo player
 Vinko Brešan, film director (on his mother's paternal frandfather's side)

See also 
 Croatia–Slovenia relations

References

External links
 Union of Slovene Alliances in Croatia

Ethnic groups in Croatia
 
Slovenian diaspora